Stantondale Football Club was an English football club based in Orrell Park, Merseyside.

Founded in 1986, they progressed through the Liverpool County Football Combination before joining the North West Counties Football League in 1992. Despite claiming the Second Division Cup during their first season at the higher level, further success within the league was to remain elusive and in 1998 the club folded.

Honours

North West Counties Football League Second Division Cup 
Winners: 1992–93
Liverpool County Football Combination First Division
Champions: 1990–91
Liverpool County Football Combination Second Division
Champions: 1987–88

References

Defunct football clubs in England
1986 establishments in England
1998 disestablishments in England
Association football clubs established in 1986
Association football clubs disestablished in 1998
North West Counties Football League clubs
Liverpool County Football Combination
Defunct football clubs in Merseyside